Deng Sanrui (October 19, 1929 - September 15, 2020) was a Chinese shipbuilding engineer. He was general designer of 7B8 ROUV. He had been hailed as "father of submarine in China".

Biography
Deng was born in Beijing on October 19, 1929, while his ancestral home was in Ningyuan County, Hunan. He attended the High School Affiliated to National Central University. In 1949, he was accepted to National Chiao Tung University, where he studied shipbuilding under  and Guo Xifen. After the outbreak of the Korean War, he was admitted by the Jiangnan Shipyard and Dalian Naval Academy. After graduating in 1953, he was dispatched to the People's Liberation Army Military Academy of Engineering as associate professor, and became full professor in 1970. In 1980, he was promoted to vice-president of Harbin Shipbuilding Engineering Institute. In 1983 he was promoted again to become president of Harbin Shipbuilding Engineering Institute. He retired in September 1998. He died on September 15, 2020, aged 90.

Honours and awards
 2005 Emeritus Professor of Harbin Engineering University

References

External links
新中国第一艘常规动力试验潜艇总设计师邓三瑞校友逝世 on Shanghai Jiao Tong University

1929 births
2020 deaths
Engineers from Beijing
Dalian Naval Academy alumni